The canton of Pontault-Combault is a French administrative division, located in the arrondissement of Torcy, in the Seine-et-Marne département (Île-de-France région).

Demographics

Composition 
At the French canton reorganisation which came into effect in March 2015, the canton was expanded from 1 to 3 communes:
Émerainville 
Pontault-Combault
Roissy-en-Brie

See also
Cantons of the Seine-et-Marne department
Communes of the Seine-et-Marne department

References

Pontault Combault